ISO 3166-2:KP is the entry for North Korea (officially the Democratic People's Republic of Korea) in ISO 3166-2, part of the ISO 3166 standard published by the International Organization for Standardization (ISO), which defines codes for the names of the principal subdivisions (e.g., provinces or states) of all countries coded in ISO 3166-1.

Currently for North Korea, ISO 3166-2 codes are defined for 2 metropolitan cities, 1 capital city, 1 special city, and 9 provinces. All of them except the metropolitan city are province-level subdivisions. The three special administrative regions, i.e., the Kaesong Industrial Region, the Mount Kumgang Tourist Region, and the Sinuiju Special Administrative Region, are not listed.

Each code consists of two parts, separated by a hyphen. The second part is two digits:
 01: capital city
 02–10: provinces
 13: special city
 14–15: metropolitan cities

Current codes
Subdivision names are listed as in the ISO 3166-2 standard published by the ISO 3166 Maintenance Agency (ISO 3166/MA).

Click on the button in the header to sort each column.

 Notes

Changes
The following changes to the entry are listed on ISO's online catalogue, the Online Browsing Platform:

The following changes to the entry have been announced in newsletters by the ISO 3166/MA since the first publication of ISO 3166-2 in 1998. ISO stopped issuing newsletters in 2013.

Codes changed in Newsletter II-1

See also
 Subdivisions of North Korea
 FIPS region codes of North Korea

External links
 ISO Online Browsing Platform: KP
 Provinces of North Korea, Statoids.com

2:KP
ISO 3166-2
North Korea geography-related lists